Camilo Minero (born Camilo Minero Nochez) was born in Zacatecoluca, El Salvador on November 11, 1917. He was a painter, muralist, and an engraver. As a painter, he worked with oil painting, prints, serigraphs, watercolours, and murals. He died from a heart attack in Sal Salvador on May 6, 2005.

In Mexico he studied at the Instituto Politécnico Nacional and the Factory of Popular Graph. One of the murals of the building of the rectory at the University of El Salvador was painted by him.

His painting work depicts all the areas of the Salvadoran life: poverty, pleasures, work, the countryside, and animals.

In 1996, he was awarded with the National Prize of Culture by the government of El Salvador.

Early life 
Minero was born to Camilo Minero, owner of a funeral home, and Josefina Mochez de Minero, who was dedicated to making fabrics.

Minero started making art at an early age and studied drawing and painting with Marcelino Carballo. He later studied at the National School of Graphic Arts in El Salvador. Due to a scholarship granted by the Salvadoran state, he obtained the opportunity to study in Mexico with great muralists such as Diego Rivera and David Alfaro Siqueiros.

Life as an artist 
Camilo Minero was known by the nickname "El pintor del pueblo" (trans. "the painter of the people"), due to his leftist political ideals. However, his affiliation with the Farabundo Marti National Liberation Front ultimately led to his imprisonment and exile.

After this time, he traveled to Mexico and Nicaragua, and taught painting and engraving classes at the Polytechnic University of Nicaragua.

He returned to El Salvador after the Chapultepec Peace Accords were signed in 1992.

Style and themes 
The colour yellow prevails across Minero's work.

His paintings depicted what life was like for Latin American people, and always tried to stand in favour to the poor and dispossessed.

References

1917 births
Year of death missing
20th-century Salvadoran painters
Male painters
People from La Paz Department (El Salvador)
Salvadoran expatriates in Mexico